Robert Lee Hart  (1866–1944), was a professional baseball player who played pitcher  in the Major Leagues for the 1890 St.Louis Browns of the American Association. He played in the minors from 1886–1892.

External links

1866 births
1944 deaths
Major League Baseball pitchers
St. Louis Browns (AA) players
19th-century baseball players
Leavenworth Soldiers players
Leadville Blues players
Milwaukee Cream Citys players
Kalamazoo Kazoos players
Jackson Jaxons players
Grand Rapids (minor league baseball) players
Grand Rapids Shamrocks players
Omaha Lambs players
St. Paul Apostles players
Duluth Whalebacks players
San Francisco Metropolitans players
Macon Central City players
Memphis Giants players
Baseball players from Missouri